All Saints' Church is a Grade I listed parish church in the Church of England serving the parish of Markham Clinton in West Markham, Nottinghamshire.

History
The church was built in the 12th century. It was repaired in 1872 and restored between 1930 and 1945.
It is in a parish with two other churches:
St Nicholas' Church, Tuxford
All Saints' Church, Weston, Nottinghamshire

Somewhat confusingly, Milton Mausoleum is sometimes also referred to as All Saints' Church, West Markham.

Organ
The church contains an organ dating from 1860 by Bevington and Sons.

Bell 
The church has one bell which is "swing chimed", it is hung on half a wheel.

Burials
The church is the burial place of Henry Pelham-Clinton, 4th Duke of Newcastle. After his wife died in 1822, the 4th Duke built a church and mausoleum at Milton, Nottinghamshire. In 1833, when the new church at Milton was finished, it became the parish church, replacing the old one at West Markham. This situation was reversed, however, in 1949 when All Saints was reinstated as the parish church, and the Duke's mausoleum was left to decay. Milton Church, now simply a mausoleum, was finally rescued in 1972 when the Churches Conservation Trust took it into guardianship.

Group of Churches 
West Markham church is part of the Tuxford Benefice.
St Nicholas, Tuxford
All Saints', West Markham
All Saints', Weston
St Matthew, Normanton on Trent;and
St Wilfrid, Marnham

Clergy 
The present Priest in Charge for the Benefice is Rev Wall, the Curate is Rev Dunk.

References

Church of England church buildings in Nottinghamshire
Grade I listed churches in Nottinghamshire
Bassetlaw District